Dane County is a county in the U.S. state of Wisconsin. As of the 2020 census, the population was 561,504, making it the second-most populous county in Wisconsin. The county seat is Madison, which is also the state capital.

Dane County is the central county of the Madison, Wisconsin, Metropolitan Statistical Area, as well as the Madison-Janesville-Beloit Combined Statistical Area.

History
Dane County was formed in 1836 as a territorial county and organized in 1839. It was named after Nathan Dane, a Massachusetts delegate to the Congress of the Confederation who helped carve Wisconsin out of the Northwest Territory.  Dane County was  settled in the 1840s by settlers from New England.

Geography

Major highways

  Interstate 39
  Interstate 90
  Interstate 94
  U.S. Highway 12
  U.S. Highway 14
  U.S. Highway 18
  U.S. Highway 51
  U.S. Highway 151
  Highway 19 (Wisconsin)
  Highway 30 (Wisconsin)
  Highway 69 (Wisconsin)
  Highway 73 (Wisconsin)
  Highway 78 (Wisconsin)
  Highway 89 (Wisconsin)
  Highway 92 (Wisconsin)
  Highway 104 (Wisconsin)
  Highway 106 (Wisconsin)
  Highway 113 (Wisconsin)
  Highway 134 (Wisconsin)
  Highway 138 (Wisconsin)
  Highway 188 (Wisconsin)

Railroads
Canadian Pacific
Wisconsin and Southern Railroad

Buses
Madison Metro
List of intercity bus stops in Wisconsin

Airports
 Blackhawk Airfield (87Y)
 Dane County Regional Airport (MSN) provides commercial airline service.
 Middleton Municipal Airport (C29)
 Verona Airport (W19)
 Waunakee Airport (6P3)

Adjacent counties
 Columbia County (north)
 Dodge County (northeast)
 Green County (south)
 Iowa County (west)
 Jefferson County (east)
 Rock County (southeast)
 Sauk County (northwest)

Demographics

In 2017, there were 5,891 births, giving a general fertility rate of 51.7 births per 1000 women aged 15–44, the eighth lowest rate out of all 72 Wisconsin counties. Of these, 73 of the births occurred at home, the fifth highest number of home births for Wisconsin counties. 428 of the births were to mothers who held doctorate or professional degrees, more than any other Wisconsin county. These accounted for 7.3% of total births for the county, a higher percent than any other Wisconsin county and more than Ozaukee County which had 5.8% of births to mothers who held doctorate or professional degrees and ranked second.

2020 census
As of the census of 2020, the population was 561,504. The racial makeup of the county was 77.6% White, 6.4% Asian, 5.4% Black or African American, 0.4% Native American, 3.2% from other races, and 6.9% from two or more races. Ethnically, the population was 7.5% Hispanic or Latino of any race.

2010 census
At the 2010 census there were 488,073 people, 203,750 households, and 116,752 families living in the county. The population density was 394 people per square mile (152/km2). There were 216,022 housing units at an average density of 174 per square mile (67/km2). The racial makeup of the county was 84.7% White, 5.2% Black or African American, 0.4% Native American, 4.7% Asian, 0.003% Pacific Islander, 2.5% from other races, and 2.5% from two or more races. 5.9% of the population were Hispanic or Latino of any race.
Of the 203,750 households 27.0% had children under the age of 18 living with them, 45.1% were married couples living together, 8.6% had a female householder with no husband present, and 42.7% were non-families. 30.5% of households were one person and 7.7% were one person aged 65 or older. The average household size was 2.33 and the average family size was 2.95.

The age distribution was 21.7% under the age of 18, 12.8% from 18 to 24, 29.5% from 25 to 44, 25.7% from 45 to 64, and 10.3% 65 or older. The median age was 34.4 years. For every 100 females, there were 97.80 males. For every 100 females age 18 and over, there were 96.00 males.

2000 census
At the 2000 census there were 426,526 people, 173,484 households, and 100,794 families living in the county. The population density was 355 people per square mile (137/km2). There were 180,398 housing units at an average density of 150 per square mile (58/km2).  The racial makeup of the county was 88.96% White, 4.00% Black or African American, 0.33% Native American, 3.45% Asian, 0.03% Pacific Islander, 1.43% from other races, and 1.79% from two or more races. 3.37% of the population were Hispanic or Latino of any race. 34.4% were of German, 11.5% Norwegian, 8.9% Irish and 6.0% English ancestry.
Of the 173,484 households 29.00% had children under the age of 18 living with them, 47.10% were married couples living together, 7.90% had a female householder with no husband present, and 41.90% were non-families. 29.40% of households were one person and 7.00% were one person aged 65 or older. The average household size was 2.37 and the average family size was 2.97.

The age distribution was 22.60% under the age of 18, 14.30% from 18 to 24, 32.50% from 25 to 44, 21.30% from 45 to 64, and 9.30% 65 or older. The median age was 33 years. For every 100 females, there were 97.90 males. For every 100 females age 18 and over, there were 96.00 males.

Religion
In 2010,  the largest religious groups in Dane County by number of adherents were Catholic at 106,036 adherents, ELCA Lutheran at 48,620 adherents, United Methodist at 9,753 adherents, non-denominational Christian at 7,448 adherents, Evangelical Free at 6,075 adherents, United Church of Christ at 5,035 adherents, Wisconsin Synod Lutheran at 4,214 adherents, Missouri Synod Lutheran at 3,921 adherents, American Baptist at 3,755 adherents, and PC-USA Presbyterian at 3,664 adherents.

Government

Dane County is governed by a county executive and a county board of supervisors. The county executive is elected in a countywide vote. The county executive is Joe Parisi. The board of supervisors consists of 37 members, each elected from single member districts. As the policy-making body of the county government, the board of supervisors enacts county ordinances, levies taxes, and appropriates money for services.

Politics
Like most other counties anchored by an urban population center and a large public university, Dane County is solidly Democratic, with a long history in the progressive movement. They have backed the Democratic presidential nominee in every election since 1960 (and the only Republican president to carry the county since 1932 was Dwight D. Eisenhower in 1952 and 1956), even in the Republican landslide victories of 1972, 1980, 1984, and 1988. In that time, Republicans have only crossed the 35% mark six times. Only the predominantly Native American county of Menominee is more reliably Democratic.

At state level, the county is no less Democratic. The last Republicans the county supported at state level were Governor Tommy Thompson and Treasurer Jack Voight in 1994. The last Republican Senator to carry the county was Alexander Wiley in 1956 by less than one percent, 10 years earlier the county was the only one in the state to not vote for notorious Senator Joseph McCarthy. In the three-party era of 1930s-1940s, the county backed Progressive Party candidates, such as the La Follette brothers, Orland Steen Loomis and Herman Ekern. 

Dane County is one of the counties in the United States to have elected a member of the Green Party (Leland Pan) into county-level office.

County executives
 George Reinke, 1973-1981
 Jonathan B. Barry, 1981-1988
 Richard J. Phelps, 1988-1997
 Kathleen Falk, 1997-2011
 Joe Parisi, 2011–present

Recreation

County parks

 Babcock County Park
 Badger Prairie County Park
 Blooming Grove Drumlins
 Blue Mounds Natural Resource Area
 Brigham County Park
 CamRock County Park
 Cherokee Marsh
 Donald County Park
 Festge County Park
 Fish Camp County Park
 Fish Lake County Park
 Goodland County Park
 Halfway Prairie School
 Indian Lake County Park
 Jenni & Kyle Preserve
 La Follette County Park
 Lake Farm County Park
 Lake View Hill Park
 Lussier County Park
 McCarthy County Park
 Mendota County Park
 Phil's Woods County Park
 Prairie Moraine County Park
 Riley-Deppe County Park
 Salmo Pond County Park
 Scheidegger Forest
 Schumacher Farm
 Stewart Lake County Park
 Token Creek County Park
 Viking County Park
 Walking Iron County Park
 Yahara Heights County Park

Communities

Cities
 Cities are incorporated, generally have a mayor (or a administrator/manager), an elected council, and generally provide more services than smaller administrative divisions.

 Edgerton (mostly in Rock County)
 Fitchburg
 Madison (county seat)
 Middleton
 Monona
 Stoughton
 Sun Prairie (city)
 Verona

Villages
 Villages are incorporated, are governed by a Village President and Board of Trustees, and provide residential services.

 Belleville (partly in Green County)
 Black Earth
 Blue Mounds
 Brooklyn (partly in Green County)
 Cambridge (partly in Jefferson County)
 Cottage Grove
 Cross Plains
 Dane
 Deerfield
 DeForest
 Maple Bluff
 Marshall
 Mazomanie
 McFarland
 Mount Horeb
 Oregon
 Rockdale
 Shorewood Hills
 Waunakee
 Windsor

Towns
 Towns may have the same name as a city or village associated with it, but it is a separate municipality. Towns are not incorporated, are governed by a town board, and only provide limited services to residents. 

 Albion
 Berry
 Black Earth (town)
 Blooming Grove
 Blue Mounds (town)
 Bristol
 Burke
 Christiana
 Cottage Grove (town)
 Cross Plains
 Dane
 Deerfield (town)
 Dunkirk
 Dunn
 Madison (town)
 Mazomanie (town)
 Medina
 Middleton (town)
 Montrose
 Oregon (town)
 Perry
 Pleasant Springs
 Primrose
 Roxbury
 Rutland
 Springdale
 Springfield
 Sun Prairie (town)
 Vermont
 Verona
 Vienna
 Westport
 York

Unincorporated communities
 Unincorporated communities are smaller communities that are governed by the town they are located in and often exist as nomenclature in vital records.

 Albion
 Aldens Corners
 Ashton
 Ashton Corners
 Bakers Corners
 Basco
 Burke
 Daleyville
 Deansville
 Door Creek
 Dunkirk
 East Bristol
 Elvers
 Five Points
 Forward
 Hanerville
 Highwood
 Hillside
 Hoffman Corners
 Indian Heights
 Kegonsa
 Kingsley Corners
 Klevenville
 London (partial)
 Lutheran Hill
 Martinsville
 Marxville
 Montrose
 Morrisonville
 Mt. Vernon
 Nora
 North Bristol
 Norway Grove
 Old Deerfield
 Paoli
 Pierceville
 Pine Bluff
 Primrose
 Riley
 Roxbury
 Rutland
 Seminary Springs
 Schey Acres
 Springfield Corners
 Stone
 Token Creek
 Utica
 Vermont
 Vilas
 West Middleton
 York Center

Neighborhoods
 Neighborhoods exist mostly for nomenclature purposes; some may have administrative associations with powers that are defined in the property deed covenants of the neighborhood. This is a partial list that primarily consists of former unincorporated communities that are now within the boundaries of an incorporated city or village. 

 Hope (Madison)
 Lake Windsor (Windsor)
 Fitchburg Center (Fitchburg)
 Middleton Junction (Madison)
 Oak Hall (Fitchburg)

Native American community
 Ho-Chunk Indian Reservation

Education
School districts (all K-12) include:

 Barneveld School District
 Belleville School District
 Cambridge School District
 Columbus School District
 DeForest Area School District
 Deerfield Community School District
 Edgerton School District
 Evansville Community School District
 Fort Atkinson School District
 Lodi School District
 Madison Metropolitan School District
 Marshall School District
 McFarland School District
 Middleton-Cross Plains School District
 Monona Grove School District
 Mount Horeb Area School District
 Oregon School District
 Pecatonica Area School District
 Poynette School District
 River Valley School District
 Sauk Prairie School District
 Stoughton Area School District
 Sun Prairie Area School District
 Verona Area School District
 Waterloo School District
 Waunakee Community School District
 Wisconsin Heights School District

See also
 National Register of Historic Places listings in Dane County, Wisconsin

References

Further reading
 Biographical Review of Dane County, Wisconsin. Chicago: Biographical Review Publishing Company, 1893.
 Cassidy, Frederic G. Dane County Place-Names. 2nd ed. Madison: University of Wisconsin Press, 2009.
 Durrie, Daniel S. A History of Madison, the Capital of Wisconsin; Including the Four Lake Country. Madison: Atwood & Culver, 1874.
 History of Dane County, Wisconsin. Chicago: Western Historical Company, 1880.
 History of Dane County, Biographical and Genealogical. Madison: Western Historical Association, 1906.
 Madison, Dane County and Surrounding Towns. Madison: W. J. Park, 1877.
 Ruff, Allen and Tracy Will. Forward!: A History of Dane, the Capital County. Cambridge, Wis: Woodhenge Press, 2000.

External links
 Official Dane County government website
 Dane County map from the Wisconsin Department of Transportation

 
1839 establishments in Wisconsin Territory
Populated places established in 1839
Madison, Wisconsin, metropolitan statistical area